Pale Olofsson (born 8 January 1947 as Paul Lennart Olofsson) is a Swedish rock musician, actor and artist. He is mostly known as one of the members of Nationalteatern.

He was born in Stockholm, (grew up in Årsta) and moved to Malmö in 1960.

He has appeared in films and TV series such as Lyftet, Lasermannen, and Let the Right One In.

Filmography

External links 
 https://www.imdb.com/name/nm0647528/

1947 births
Living people
Swedish male musicians